Charlotte "Charli" Howard (born 6 April 1991) is an English model, author and body activist. She is from South-East London, England. She is best known for her work as a plus-size model, as well as her activism for diversity within the fashion industry. In September 2019, she was announced as the presenter of new BBC podcast Fashion Fix, a podcast about the fashion industry.

Modelling 
Howard has worked for numerous brands and fashion campaigns, including Maybelline, Redken, British Vogue, Allure magazine and Pat McGrath. She is one of the faces of Pat McGrath's beauty line and considered a "McGrath Muse".

Howard had tried, unsuccessfully, to model in her teens, being rejected from numerous agencies. At 21, she was signed to a London-based agency after her friend submitted her Facebook photos without her knowledge.

In 2015, Howard was dropped by her then-London model agency for allegedly being "too big" to model. In response to being dropped, she wrote a lengthy Facebook post that subsequently went viral, with thousands of shares, with Howard appearing on Channel 4 news to share her side of the story. Upon hearing about the post, New York-based model agency Muse Management signed her, and Howard moved to New York.

Controversially, Howard is considered a "plus size" model, despite only being a UK size 10-12/US 6-8. In an interview with Hello! magazine, Howard is quoted as saying, "I've got a D cup boob, I've got a size 10 to 12 hip - well, a 12 probably - and I've got a tummy that never seems to go away, no matter how many sit-ups I do... I'm curvy, but I know that I'm not a plus-size model and I've not given myself that term. That's what other people label me."

In January 2019, Howard was announced as the new face of global lingerie brand, Agent Provocateur.

Books 
Howard published two books in 2018: Splash, a middle-grade novel surrounding issues such as bullying, friendships and body image, and Misfit, a memoir about Howard's battles with eating disorders, OCD, and anxiety. Howard told the Guardian newspaper that she wishes to “create strong literary characters for girls” in her books. Misfit was published in February 2018 by Penguin Random House. In it, Howard describes her battles with eating disorders and other mental illnesses, including anxiety and depression.

Howard's first children's novel, Splash, was published by Nosy Crow books in July 2018. In an interview with Hello! Fashion Monthly magazine, Howard says she wrote the book "to pass the time". Author Jacqueline Wilson described Splash as a "much-needed book that will strike a chord with so many girls - and help them dare to be different."

References

1991 births
Living people
21st-century English women writers
English female models